An immune receptor (or immunologic receptor) is a receptor, usually on a cell membrane, which binds to a substance (for example, a cytokine) and causes a response in the immune system.

Types
The main receptors in the immune system are pattern recognition receptors (PRRs), Toll-like receptors (TLRs), killer activated and killer inhibitor receptors (KARs and KIRs), complement receptors, Fc receptors, B cell receptors and T cell receptors.

See also
 Antigen

References

External links
 

Immune system
Single-pass transmembrane proteins